Hamza Anani (born 6 January 1988 in Barbacha, Béjaïa Province) is an Algerian professional footballer. He currently plays as a forward for the Algerian Ligue 1 club AS Aïn M'lila.

Statistics

References

External links

1988 births
Living people
People from Barbacha
Kabyle people
Algerian footballers
USM Alger players
JSM Béjaïa players
Olympique de Médéa players
Algerian Ligue Professionnelle 1 players
Algerian Ligue 2 players
Association football forwards
AS Aïn M'lila players
21st-century Algerian people